Michael Conroy  is a Gaelic footballer who plays for Davitts and the Mayo county team.
He started at right corner forward and scored a point in the 2012 All-Ireland Final which Mayo lost by 0-13 to 2-11 against Donegal.

References

Year of birth missing (living people)
Living people
Mayo inter-county Gaelic footballers